Newmark is a surname. Notable people with the surname include:

Andy Newmark, American musician
Bobby Newmark, fictional character in novel
Brooks Newmark (born 1958), British politician, Member of Parliament for Braintree
Craig Newmark, founder of Craigslist
Dave Newmark, former basketball player
Harris Newmark, former businessman and historian
Joseph Newmark (1799–1881), Prussian-born American rabbi.
Nathan M. Newmark, structural engineer
Peter Newmark (1916–2011), an English professor of translation

See also
Newmark-beta method, numerical integration method
Newmark Group, a commercial real estate company
Newmark's influence chart, method of showing soil pressure
Newmark's sliding block, a calculation method in engineering
Newmark Theatre in Portland, Oregon
CUNY Newmark Journalism School in New York, NY